Sister Drum (阿姐鼓) is the second studio album by Chinese singer Dadawa(music by He Xuntian), which is heavily influenced by the music of Tibet. The album is notable for being the first Asian CD to ship over one million copies in China.

In traditional Tibetan culture, Sister Drum, whose drumhead is made out of a pure girl's skin, was used for honoring the god. This practice is now prohibited in modern Tibet. This studio 'Sister Drum' is based on this cruel context. Only the skin of a pure girl could be chosen to make the drumhead. To prevent them from disturbing in the real world, those girls are better mutes. If it is necessary, sometimes their tongues would be cut out. 

 The use of Tibetan folk music as the basis for some of her recordings has caused some controversy relating to China's heavy handed authoritarian rule over Tibet.  A music video was made for the title track.

Track listing
没有阴影的家园 "Home Without Shadow" - 5:52
阿姐鼓 "Sister Drum" - 5:46
天唱 "Sky Burial" - 7:32
笛威辛亢纽威辛亢(天堂、地狱) "Di Swi Shin Kan, New Wei Shin Kan (Paradise Inferno)" - 4:41
羚羊过山岗 "Crossing the Ridge" - 5:59
卓玛的卓玛 "Zhouma of Zhoumas" - 4:55
转经 "Turning Scripture" - 9:05

References
Artist Direct article showing track lengths
BBC Radio article

Dadawa albums
Sire Records albums